The Men's slalom competition of the 2018 Winter Paralympics was held at Jeongseon Alpine Centre,
South Korea. The competition took place on 17 March 2018.

Medal table

Visually impaired
In the downhill visually impaired, the athlete with a visual impairment has a sighted guide. The two skiers are considered a team, and dual medals are awarded.

Run 1 was started at 09:30 and run 2 was started at 14:00.

Standing
Run 1 was started at 10:30 and run 2 was started at 14:22.

Sitting
Run 1 was started at 11:30 and run 2 was started at 14:57.

See also
Alpine skiing at the 2018 Winter Olympics

References

Men's slalom